We Are England is a regional current affairs documentary programme shown on BBC One. The programme is made by six teams around England, based in Birmingham, London, Bristol, Leeds, Newcastle and Norwich. The programme airs six original half-hour documentaries each week, with each week themed around a different topic; the first theme was Mental Health. The programme replaced regional current affairs show Inside Out. A notable change was that each We Are England episode is a single half hour documentary, whereas Inside Out normally aired a collection of short-form pieces in its 30 minute slot. Another change is a cutback in the number of teams, from 11 regional hubs to six.

Broadcast
Aisling O'Connor, the head of TV commissioning for BBC England, commissioned 120 episodes to be broadcast in 2022, with the first being shown on 26 January 2022 at 7:30pm. In-addition to being shown on BBC One and BBC iPlayer select episodes are also repeated on BBC News.

The first four episodes of We Are England aired on Wednesdays at 7:30pm. After the fourth Farming England, the series moved to a timeslot of 8:30pm. This move was due to the BBC's decision to schedule a new 'soap hour' over its two main channels with a regular timeslot for EastEnders on BBC One at 7.30pm.

In May 2022, the BBC announced a raft of closures, restructures and cost-cutting measures. One of these was the decision not to renew We Are England for a third series.

In July 2022, a number of documentaries from the We Are England strand (including ones featuring Bimini, Jayde Adams and Jassa Ahluwalia) were repeated on BBC Three,  alongside a number of similarly formatted 30 minute documentaries. However, rather than being grouped under the We Are England or Our Lives brands, these new documentaries were now just being listed under one off titles such as Filthy Business and Queen of Trucks on the BBC iPlayer and in programme guides.

Episode list
We Are England launched on 26 January 2022, airing 60 original half hour documentaries over 10 weeks. In February 2022, an episode about a cryptocurrency trader from the Bossing It theme (about young entrepreneurs) was pulled from broadcast at late notice, citing "editorial concerns". Another episode was later taken down from BBC iPlayer, Unfiltered, a BBC Cambridgeshire and East documentary originally broadcast in that region on 26 January 2022, which featured 19 year old dancer Mia and had an appearance from TV personality Vicky Pattison.

References

External links
 

2020s British television series
2022 British television series debuts
BBC television documentaries
British television news shows
English-language television shows
Current affairs shows